Ralph Green (c. 1379 – 1417), of Drayton, Northamptonshire, was an English Member of Parliament for Northamptonshire in October 1404 and 1410.

References

1379 births
1417 deaths
People from West Northamptonshire District
15th-century English people
English MPs October 1404
English MPs 1410